The 1989–90 NBA season was the Kings' 41st season in the National Basketball Association, and fifth season in Sacramento. The Kings won the Draft Lottery and selected Pervis Ellison out of Louisville with the first overall pick of the 1989 NBA draft, and acquired Ralph Sampson from the Golden State Warriors during the off-season. However, prior to the start of the season, the Kings were hit with tragedy as Ricky Berry, who had just completed a solid rookie season, committed suicide on August 14, 1989 at the age of 24; Berry died of a self-inflicted gunshot wound to the head at his suburban home in Sacramento after an argument with his wife, Valerie.

After a 7–21 start to the season, head coach Jerry Reynolds was fired and replaced with Dick Motta. At midseason, Kenny Smith was traded to the Atlanta Hawks in exchange for Antoine Carr. Injuries limited Ellison to only just 34 games, as the Kings finished last place in the Pacific Division with a 23–59 record. 

Following the season, Ellison was traded to the Washington Bullets, while Danny Ainge was traded to the Portland Trail Blazers, and Rodney McCray was dealt to the Dallas Mavericks.

Draft picks

Roster

Regular season

Season standings

z - clinched division title
y - clinched division title
x - clinched playoff spot

Record vs. opponents

Game log

Player statistics

Awards and records

Transactions

References

See also
 1989-90 NBA season

Sacramento Kings seasons
Sacramento
Sacramento
Sacramento